Joseph Gerard Rafferty (born 6 October 1993) is a professional footballer who plays  for EFL League One club Portsmouth. Rafferty can operate as a fullback, wingback and as a midfielder. Born in England, he has represented the Republic of Ireland at youth level. 

He was born and raised in the city of Liverpool where he started his footballing career.

Rafferty has played internationally for the Republic of Ireland three times at under-18 and once at under-19 level.

Club career

Liverpool
Rafferty spent his youth career with Liverpool, and in 2011 was made captain of the Under-18 side. Whilst at Liverpool he was capped by the Republic of Ireland at Under 18 level making his debut in 2010 in the Jerez tournament against Czech Republic in Prague. The following season Rafferty represented Republic of Ireland at Under 19 levels.

Rochdale
He joined Football League Two side Rochdale on 2 July 2012. On 4 September 2012 Rafferty made his first-team debut for Rochdale in the Football League Trophy against Fleetwood Town coming on as an 82nd-minute substitute for Brian Barry-Murphy. On 16 May 2013 Rafferty signed a new 1-year contract at Rochdale. on 8 October 2013 Rafferty scored his first professional goal with a header against Port Vale in the Football League Trophy. On 26 April 2014 Rafferty was part of the Rochdale team which won promotion to League One. On 1 July 2014, Rafferty agreed a new two-year contract extending his stay at Spotland until May 2016.

At the end of the 2016–17 season, Rochdale AFC confirmed Rafferty had signed a new two-year deal with the club. At the end of season awards Rafferty won both the Rochdale supporters player of the year and the SMAC Dale supporters club player of the year.

Preston North End
On 23 January 2019 Rafferty joined Preston North End on a three and a half year deal for an undisclosed fee. Rafferty scored his first goal for the club away at Swansea on 17 August 2019.

Rafferty was released at the end of the 2021–22 season.

Portsmouth
On 11 July 2022, Rafferty joined EFL League One club Portsmouth on a two-year deal.

Career statistics

Honours
Individual
Rochdale Player of the Year: 2016–17

References

External links

1993 births
Living people
Republic of Ireland association footballers
English footballers
Association football defenders
Rochdale A.F.C. players
Liverpool F.C. players
Preston North End F.C. players
Portsmouth F.C. players
English Football League players
Republic of Ireland youth international footballers